Grass Lake High School is a public high school in Grass Lake, Michigan.  It has about 400 students. The school, though it has been in multiple locations over the years, can trace its institutional history back to 1863.

Notable people
Author Maritta Wolff, who wrote the 1941 bestseller Whistle Stop and other books, was a graduate of Grass Lake High School.

Athletics

Football

Baseball
State Championships: 1979-1980, 1987-1988, 2008. In 1998-1999 team had the most HR's In GL history.  1985 State runners up, loss in extra innings.

Wrestling
State Championships: 1985, 1986, 1989

Girls Track & Field
State Championships: 1977, 1978

Boys Track & Field
State Championships: 1969, 1970, 2021, 2022

Boys Cross Country
State Championships: 1993, 1995, 1996, 1997, 1998

References

External links
Grass Lake High School official website

Public high schools in Michigan
Schools in Jackson County, Michigan
1863 establishments in Michigan